Leonardo Medeiros da Silva (born 14 January 1988), known as Léo Kanu, is a Brazilian professional footballer who plays for Internacional de Lages, as a central defender.

Career
After a series of good performances at the Campeonato Gaúcho, he was bought by Benfica for 996 thousand euros.

He was immediately loaned to Belenenses for one season, and he managed to gain his space at the starting eleven, playing the fifth round of the Taça de Portugal against Sporting CP. However, with the arrival of new manager, Marco Paulo, he lost his place. Later in the season, he criticized the club on Twitter and was suspended.

On 24 July 2012, he returned to Brazil, to play at Ponte Preta on loan from Benfica, but couldn't break into the first team so on 17 December 2012, he moved to Grêmio Esportivo Osasco in Campeonato Paulista Série A3. In 2014, he signed with Náutico in permanent basis, but only managed one appearance before being released. In February 2015, he signed with São José-PA in the Campeonato Gaúcho. After eight months with them, he moved to another team in the Campeonato Gáucho, Passo Fundo. Kanu changed teams again in April 2016, when he signed with Avenida. In July 2016, he moved to Aimoré, and in early 2017, to Treze.

Kanu continued on his journeyman career at Internacional de Lages.

Honours
Best central defender from the 2011 Campeonato Gaúcho by Federação Gaúcha de Futebol

References

External links
 
 

1988 births
Living people
Footballers from Porto Alegre
Brazilian footballers
Association football defenders
Esporte Clube Cruzeiro players
Associação Atlética Ponte Preta players
Clube Náutico Capibaribe players
C.F. Os Belenenses players
S.L. Benfica footballers
Esporte Clube São José players
Treze Futebol Clube players
Brazilian expatriate footballers
Expatriate footballers in Portugal
Brazilian expatriate sportspeople in Portugal